Elvish languages are constructed languages used by Elves in a fantasy setting. The philologist and fantasy author J. R. R. Tolkien created the first of these languages, including Quenya and Sindarin.

Tolkien's Elvish languages

The philologist and high fantasy author J. R. R. Tolkien created many languages for his Elves, leading him to create the mythology of his Middle-earth books, complete with multiple divisions of the Elves, to speak the languages he had constructed. The languages have quickly spread in modern-day use. His interest was primarily philological, and he stated that his stories grew out of his languages. The languages were the first thing Tolkien created for his mythos, starting with what he originally called "Qenya", the first primitive form of Elvish. This was later called Quenya (High-elven) and is one of the two most complete of Tolkien's languages (the other being Sindarin, or Grey-elven). The phonology and grammar of Quenya are influenced by Finnish, while Sindarin is influenced by Welsh.

Tolkien conceived a family tree of Elvish languages, all descending from a common ancestor called Primitive Quendian. He worked extensively on how the languages diverged from Primitive Quendian over time, in phonology and grammar, in imitation of the development of real language families. In addition to Quenya and Sindarin, he sketched several other Elvish languages in far less detail, such as Telerin, Nandorin, and Avarin.

In addition to Tolkien's original lexicon, many fans have contributed words and phrases, attempting to create a language that can be fully used in reality.

Other Elvish languages

Since Tolkien, others have invented Elvish languages in their own fiction. Some have borrowed sounds, forms, and whole words from Tolkien's Elvish languages.

References

External links
 Writing with Elvish fonts
 Sindarin Dictionary

 
Fictional languages